Lamordé University Hospital or Lamordé National Hospital is a teaching hospital in Niamey, Niger. Affiliated with Abdou Moumouni University, the facility has 72 beds. It was the first public hospital in Niger to provide fistula repair services.

References

Hospitals in Niger
Medical education in Niger
Teaching hospitals
Buildings and structures in Niamey
Abdou Moumouni University